The 2023 PEI Tankard, the provincial men's curling championship for Prince Edward Island, was held from January 25 to 29 at the Crapaud Community Curling Club in Crapaud, Prince Edward Island. The event was held in conjunction with the 2023 Prince Edward Island Scotties Tournament of Hearts, the provincial women's championship.

The winning Tyler Smith rink represented Prince Edward Island at the 2023 Tim Hortons Brier in London, Ontario where they finished eighth in Pool B with a 2–6 record.

This is the first time since 2021 that the event will be held due to the COVID-19 pandemic in Canada.

Teams
The teams are listed as follows:

Knockout brackets

Source:

A event

B event

C event

Knockout results
All draw times are listed in Atlantic Time (UTC−04:00).

Draw 1
Wednesday, January 25, 9:00 am

Draw 2
Wednesday, January 25, 2:00 pm

Draw 3
Wednesday, January 25, 7:00 pm

Draw 4
Thursday, January 26, 9:00 am

Draw 5
Thursday, January 26, 2:00 pm

Draw 6
Thursday, January 26, 7:00 pm

Draw 7
Friday, January 27, 9:00 am

Draw 8
Friday, January 27, 2:00 pm

Draw 9
Friday, January 27, 7:00 pm

Draw 10
Saturday, January 28, 9:00 am

Draw 11
Saturday, January 28, 2:00 pm

Draw 12
Saturday, January 28, 7:00 pm

Playoffs
Source:

Semifinal
Sunday, January 12, 9:00 am

Final
 Not needed as Team Smith would've needed to be beaten twice

References

External links

Prince Edward Island
Curling competitions in Prince Edward Island
January 2023 sports events in Canada
2023 in Prince Edward Island
Queens County, Prince Edward Island